Brian Iwata is an American psychologist who is currently a Distinguished Professor at University of Florida.

Research 
Among other research, he is known for having contributed to the development of the graduated electronic decelerator or GED which is an aversive conditioning device that delivers a powerful electric skin shock to punish behaviors considered undesirable. Dr. Iwata later spoke out against the use of GEDs and stated that he found success treating even the most difficult of self injurious behaviors using less punitive methods. GEDs have since been banned in the United States by the United States Food and Drug Administration in 2020.

See also
 Nathan Azrin

References

External links
 https://www.abainternational.org/constituents/bios/brianiwata.aspx Brian Iwata listing at Association of Behavior Analysis International

Year of birth missing (living people)
Living people
University of Florida faculty
21st-century American psychologists
Loyola College (Montreal) alumni
Florida State University alumni